The John Dos Passos Prize is an annual literary award given to American writers.

The Prize was founded at Longwood University in 1980 and is meant to honor John Dos Passos by recognizing other writers in his name. The prize is administered by a committee from the Department of English and Modern Languages; the chair of the committee also serves as the chair of the prize jury. Other members on the committee include the immediate past recipient and a distinguished critic, editor, or scholar.

Recipients of the prize receive $5,000 and a bronze medal engraved with their name.

Recipients

References

External links
Dos Passos Prize, official website

American fiction awards
Awards established in 1980
1980 establishments in Virginia
Longwood University